The first season of the American comedy-drama television series Girls premiered on HBO on April 15, 2012, and consisted on 10 episodes, concluding on June 17, 2012. The series was created by Lena Dunham, who portrays the lead character, who based the premise and central aspects of the show on her personal life. It was produced by Apatow Productions, I Am Jenni Konnor Productions and HBO productions.

The season introduces Dunham's character Hannah Horvath, an immature aspiring writer from East Lansing, Michigan who is in for a surprise when she is informed by her parents that they will no longer support her financially. Having received their support for two years, following her graduation from Oberlin College, Hannah struggles with her newly established independence as she is left to her own devices in Greenpoint, Brooklyn. Within Hannah's circle of friends they include Marnie Michaels (Allison Williams), Jessa Johansson (Jemima Kirke) and Shoshanna Shapiro (Zosia Mamet).

Cast and characters

Main 
 Lena Dunham as Hannah Helene Horvath, an aspiring writer living in Greenpoint, Brooklyn, known for her narcissism and immaturity, who struggles to support herself and find a direction in her life. 
 Allison Williams as Marnie Michaels, Hannah's best friend, roommate and classmate of Hannah's at Oberlin College.
 Jemima Kirke as Jessa Johansson, one of Hannah's closest friends, Jessa is a global citizen of British origin, and is noted for her bohemian, unpredictable, and brash personality. 
 Zosia Mamet as Shoshanna Shapiro, Jessa's bubble-headed and innocent American cousin who's a Media, Culture, and Communications major at New York University.   
 Adam Driver as Adam Sackler. Hannah's casual boyfriend - an aloof, passionate young man, Adam works as a part-time carpenter and actor. He is an alcoholic who has been sober for years.

Recurring 

 Christopher Abbott as Charlie Dattolo (episodes 1–5, 7, 10)
 Alex Karpovsky as Raymond "Ray" Ploshansky (episodes 1, 4, 5, 7, 9, 10)  
 Andrew Rannells as portrays Elijah Krantz (episode 3, 5, 7, 10)
 Becky Ann Baker as portrays Loreen Horvath (episodes 1, 6)
 Peter Scolari as portrays Tad Horvath (episode 1, episode 6)
 James LeGros as Jeff Lavoyt (episodes 3–5, 7)
 Kathryn Hahn as Katherine Lavoyt (episodes 3–5, 9)
 Clare Foley as Lola Lavoyt (episodes 3, 4)
 Mackenzie Gray as Beatrix Lavoyt (episodes 3, 4)
 Richard Masur as Rich Glatter (episodes 4, 5)
 Chris O'Dowd as Thomas-John (episodes 8, 10)

Guest 

 Chris Eigeman as Alistair (episode 1)
 Alexi Wasser as Alexi (episode 1)
 Elaine Chun as Joy Lin (episode 1)
 Mike Birbiglia as Brian (episode 2)
 Morgan Krantz as Morgan (episode 2)
 Sakina Jaffrey as Gynecologist (episode 2)
 Christina Kirk as Reese (episode 3)
 Jorma Taccone as Booth Jonathan (episode 3)
 Horatio Sanz as Terry Lavoyt (episode 4)
 Skylar Astin as Matt Kornstein (episode 4)
 Lesley Arfin as Lesley (episode 4)
 Daniel Eric Gold as Jessa's Ex-Boyfriend (episode 5)
 Lou Taylor Pucci as Eric (episode 6)
 Philip Ettinger as Zach (episode 6)
 Roberta Colindrez as Tako (episode 7)
 Audrey Gelman as Audrey (episode 7)
 Henry Zebrowski as Gavin (episode 8)
 Michael Imperioli as Powell Goldman (episode 9)
 Jenny Slate as Tally Schifrin (episode 9)
 Billy Morrissette as George (episode 10)

Episodes

Release

Critical reception 
The first season of Girls received universal acclaim from television critics. On the review aggregator website Metacritic, the first season of the series holds an average of 87 based on 29 reviews. The website also lists the show as the highest-rated fictional series debut of 2012. James Poniewozik from Time reserved high praise for the series, calling it "raw, audacious, nuanced and richly, often excruciatingly funny". Tim Goodman of The Hollywood Reporter called Girls "one of the most original, spot-on, no-missed-steps series in recent memory". Reviewing the first three episodes at the 2012 SXSW Festival, he said the series conveys "real female friendships, the angst of emerging adulthood, nuanced relationships, sexuality, self-esteem, body image, intimacy in a tech-savvy world that promotes distance, the bloodlust of surviving New York on very little money and the modern parenting of entitled children, among many other things—all laced together with humor and poignancy". The New York Times also applauded the series and said: "Girls may be the millennial generation's rebuttal to Sex and the City, but the first season was at times as cruelly insightful and bleakly funny as Louie on FX or Curb Your Enthusiasm on HBO."

Accolades 
 Nominated: Critics' Choice Award for Best Comedy Series — Girls 
 Nominated: Critics' Choice Award for Best Actress in a Comedy Series — Lena Dunham
 Nominated: TCA Award for Outstanding New Program — Girls
 Nominated: TCA Award for Individual Achievement in Comedy — Lena Dunham
 Nominated: Primetime Emmy Award for Outstanding Comedy Series — Girls 
 Nominated: Primetime Emmy Award for Outstanding Lead Actress in a Comedy Series — Lena Dunham
 Nominated: Primetime Emmy Award for Outstanding Directing for a Comedy Series — Lena Dunham 
 Nominated: Primetime Emmy Award for Outstanding Writing for a Comedy Series — Lena Dunham
 Win: Primetime Emmy Award for Outstanding Casting for a Comedy Series — Jennifer Euston 
 Nominated: Satellite Awards for Best Television Series – Musical or Comedy — Girls
 Nominated: Satellite Awards for Best Actress – Television Series Musical or Comedy — Lena Dunham
 Nominated: Writers Guild of America Award for Comedy Series — Girls
 Win: Writers Guild of America Award for New Series — Girls
 Nominated: Women's Image Network Award for Outstanding Film / Show Written by A Woman — Lena Dunham
 Nominated: Women's Image Network Award for Outstanding Film / Show Directed by A Woman — Lena Dunham
 Win: Peabody Award for Area of Excellence — Girls 
 Win: Golden Globe Award for Best Television Series – Comedy or Musical — Girls
 Win: Golden Globe Award for Best Performance by an Actress in a Television Series – Comedy or Musical — Lena Dunham
 Win: Directors Guild of America Award for Outstanding Directorial Achievement in Comedy Series — Lena Dunham 
 Win: Art Directors Guild Award for Episode of a Half Hour Single-Camera Television Series — Judy Becker 
 Win: British Academy Television Awards – International Prize — Girls

Ratings

Home media

References

External links
 
 

2012 American television seasons